Karl Swanke (born December 29, 1957) is a former American football offensive tackle in the National Football League (NFL). He was drafted by the Green Bay Packers in the sixth round of the 1980 NFL Draft. He played college football at Boston College.

References

1957 births
Living people
American football offensive tackles
American football offensive guards
American football centers
Boston College Eagles football players
Green Bay Packers players
Ed Block Courage Award recipients